A list of Mexican films released in Mexico in 1966 (chronologically ordered by release date):

1966

External links

1966
Films
Mexican